(born 3 October 1979) is a Japanese model and actress. She is a graduate of Kyushu Sangyo University, where she studied fine arts.

History
Her first big break came as a model for CanCam, with whom she had an exclusive contract. She has since appeared in several TV dramas, including Tokumei Kakarichō Tadano Hitoshi (TV Asahi, 2007).

Widely known by her nickname "Ebi-chan", she is especially popular with young men and women. She has been quoted as saying, "If someone doesn't find me cute, I want to know why, because then I'll work on it to get better at being cute".

Since 2009, she has been an exclusive model for twenties female fashion magazine AneCan. She also appeared on the fashion magazine Domani targeted thirties as an exclusive model starting with the July 2015 issue.

Personal life
Ebihara has a younger twin sister, Eri (ja), as well as a younger brother. In May 2010, Ebihara announced that she had married Ilmari from the music group Rip Slyme. Their son was born in 2015 and daughter in 2021.

Appearances

Films 
 Tokumei Kachō Tadano Hitoshi Saigo no Gekijōban (2008)

TV dramas
 Tokumei Kakarichō Tadano Hitoshi (TV Asahi, 2003), Kazue Yamabuki
 Salary Man Kintarō 4 (TBS, 2004), Masami Aikawa
 Slow Dance (Fuji TV, 2005), Yukie Sonoda
 Woman's Island: Kanojotachi no Sentaku (NTV, 2006)
 Busu no Hitomi ni Koishiteru (Fuji TV, 2006), Yumi Ebihara
 Oniyome Nikki Īyu Dana (Fuji TV, 2007)
 Doukyūsei: Hito wa, Sando, Koi o Suru (TBS, 2014), herself

Bibliography

Magazines
 CanCam, Shogakukan 1982-, as an exclusive model from 2003 to 2008
 AneCan, Shogakukan 2007-, as an exclusive model from 2009 to 2016
 Domani, Shogakukan 1997-, as an exclusive model since 2015

Photobooks
 EBI01 (Shogakukan, 1 October 2011)

References

External links
 Pearl model profile 
 AneCan model profile 
 Official blog 
 Official blog on AneCan.tv 

Japanese actresses
1979 births
Living people
People from Miyazaki Prefecture
Japanese female models
Japanese television personalities
Models from Miyazaki Prefecture